A chariot is a type of cart driven by a charioteer, usually using horses to provide rapid motive power. The oldest known chariots have been found in burials of the Sintashta culture in modern-day Chelyabinsk Oblast, Russia, dated to c. 2000 BCE. The critical invention that allowed the construction of light, horse-drawn chariots was the spoked wheel.

The chariot was a fast, light, open, two-wheeled conveyance drawn by two or more horses that were hitched side by side, and was little more than a floor with a waist-high guard at the front and sides. It was initially used for ancient warfare during the Bronze and Iron Ages, but after its military capabilities had been superseded by light and heavy cavalries, chariots continued to be used for travel and transport, in processions, for games, and in races.

Etymology
The word "chariot" comes from the Latin term carrus, a loanword from Gaulish. In ancient Rome and some other ancient Mediterranean civilizations, a biga required two horses, a triga three, and a quadriga four.

Origins at the Eurasian steppe 

The invention of the wheel used in transportation most likely took place in the Eurasian Steppes of modern-day Russia and Ukraine. Evidence of wheeled vehicles appears from the mid 4th millennium BC near-simultaneously in the Northern Caucasus (Maykop culture), and in Central Europe. These earliest vehicles may have been ox carts. A necessary precursor to the invention of the chariot is the domestication of animals, specifically horses – a major step in the development of civilization. Despite the large impact horse domestication has had in transport and communication, tracing its origins has been challenging. Evidence supports horses having been domesticated in the Eurasian Steppes, with studies suggesting the Botai culture in modern-day Kazakhstan were the first, about 3500 BCE. Others say horses were domesticated earlier than 3500 in Eastern Europe (modern Ukraine and Western Kazkhstan), 6000 years ago 

The spread of spoke-wheeled chariots has been closely associated with early Indo-Iranian migrations. The earliest known chariots have been found in Sintashta culture burial sites, and the culture is considered a strong candidate for the origin of the technology, which spread throughout the Old World and played an important role in ancient warfare. It is also strongly associated with the ancestors of modern domestic horses, the DOM2 population. (DOM2 horses originated from the Western Eurasia steppes, especially the lower Volga-Don, but not in Anatolia, during the late fourth and early third millennia BCE. Their genes may show selection for easier domestication and stronger backs).
These self-designated Aryan people migrated southward into South Asia, ushering in the Vedic period around 1750 BCE. Shortly after this, about 1700 BCE, evidence of chariots appears in Asia-Minor.

The earliest fully developed spoke-wheeled horse chariots are from the chariot burials of the Andronovo (Timber-Grave) sites of the Sintashta-Petrovka Proto-Indo-Iranian culture in modern Russia and Kazakhstan from around 2000 BCE. This culture is at least partially derived from the earlier Yamna culture. It built heavily fortified settlements, engaged in bronze metallurgy on an industrial scale, and practiced complex burial rituals reminiscent of Hindu rituals known from the Rigveda and the Avesta. Over the next few centuries, the Andronovo culture spread across the steppes from the Urals to the Tien Shan, likely corresponding to the time of early Indo-Iranian cultures.

Not everyone agrees that the Sintashta culture vehicle finds are true chariots.

In 1996 Joost Crouwel and Mary Aiken Littauer wrote
Peter Raulwing and Stefan Burmeister consider the Sintashta and Krivoe Ozero finds from the steppe to be carts rather than chariots.

Spread by Indo-Europeans

Chariots figure prominently in Indo-Iranian mythology. Chariots are also an important part of both Hindu and Persian mythology, with most of the gods in their pantheon portrayed as riding them. The Sanskrit word for a chariot is rátha- (m.), which is cognate with Avestan raθa- (also m.), and in origin a substantiation of the adjective Proto-Indo-European  meaning "having wheels", with the characteristic accent shift found in Indo-Iranian substantivisations. This adjective is in turn derived from the collective noun  "wheels", continued in Latin rota, which belongs to the noun  for "wheel" (from  "to run") that is also found in Germanic, Celtic and Baltic (Old High German rad n., Old Irish roth m., Lithuanian rãtas m.). Nomadic tribes of the Pontic steppes, like Scythians such as Hamaxobii, would travel in wagons, carts, and chariots during their migrations.

Hittites

The oldest testimony of chariot warfare in the ancient Near East is the Old Hittite Anitta text (18th century BCE), which mentions 40 teams of horses (in the original cuneiform spelling: 40 ṢÍ-IM-TI ANŠE.KUR.RAḪI.A) at the siege of Salatiwara. Since the text mentions teams rather than chariots, the existence of chariots in the 18th century BCE is uncertain. The first certain attestation of chariots in the Hittite empire dates to the late 17th century BCE (Hattusili I). A Hittite horse-training text is attributed to Kikkuli the Mitanni (15th century BCE).

The Hittites were renowned charioteers. They developed a new chariot design that had lighter wheels, with four spokes rather than eight, and that held three rather than two warriors. It could hold three warriors because the wheel was placed in the middle of the chariot and not at the back as in Egyptian chariots. Typically one Hittite warrior steered the chariot while the second man was usually the main archer; the third warrior would either wield a spear or sword when charging at enemies or hold up a large shield to protect himself and the others from enemy arrows.

Hittite prosperity largely depended on their control of trade routes and natural resources, specifically metals. As the Hittites gained dominion over Mesopotamia, tensions flared among the neighboring Assyrians, Hurrians, and Egyptians. Under Suppiluliuma I, the Hittites conquered Kadesh and, eventually, the whole of Syria. The Battle of Kadesh in 1274 BCE is likely to have been the largest chariot battle ever fought, involving over 5,000 chariots.

Bronze Age India

Models of single axled, solid wheeled, ox drawn vehicles, have been found at several mature Indus Valley cites, such as Chanhudaro, Daimabad, Harappa, and Nausharo, and are depicted in second millennium BCE Chalcolithic rock art, of the region.

Spoked-wheeled, horse drawn, chariots, often carrying an armed passenger, are depicted in second millennium BCE Chalcolithic period rock paintings.. Examples are know from Chibbar Nulla, Chhatur Bhoj Nath Nulla, and Kathotia. There are some depictions of chariots among the petroglyphs in the sandstone of the Vindhya range. Two depictions of chariots are found in Morhana Pahar, Mirzapur district. One depicts a biga and the head of the driver. The second depicts a quadriga, with six-spoked wheels, and a driver standing up in a large chariot box. This chariot is being attacked. One figure, who is armed with a shield and a mace, stands in the chariot's path; another figure, who is armed with bow and arrow, threatens the right flank. It has been suggested (speculated) that the drawings record a story, most probably dating to the early centuries BCE, from some center in the area of the Ganges–Yamuna plain into the territory of still Neolithic hunting tribes. The very realistic chariots carved into the Sanchi stupas are dated to roughly the 1st century.

Bronze Age solid-disk wheel carts were found in 2018 at Sinauli, which were interpreted by some as horse-pulled "chariots," predating the arrival of the horse-centered Indo-Aryans. They were ascribed by Sanjay Manjul, director of the excavations, to the Ochre Coloured Pottery culture (OCP)/Copper Hoard Culture, which was contemporaneous with the Late Harappan culture, and interpreted by him as horse-pulled chariots. Majul further noted that "the rituals relating to the Sanauli burials showed close affinity with Vedic rituals, and stated that "the dating of the Mahabharata is around 1750 BCE." According to Asko Parpola these finds were ox-pulled carts, indicating that these burials are related to an early Aryan migration of Proto-Indo-Iranian speaking people into the Indian subcontinent, "forming then the ruling elite of a major Late Harappan settlement."

Horse-drawn chariots, as well as their cult and associated rituals, were spread by the Indo-Iranians, and horses and horse-drawn chariots were introduced in India by the Indo-Aryans.

In Religion
In Rigveda, Indra is described as strong willed, armed with a thunderbolt, riding a chariot:Among Rigvedic deities, notably the Vedic Sun God Surya rides on a one spoked chariot driven by his charioteer Aruṇa. Ushas (the dawn) rides in a chariot, as well as Agni in his function as a messenger between gods and men.

The Jain Bhagavi Sutra states that Indian troops used a chariot with a club or mace attached to it during the war against the Licchavis during the reign of Ajatashatru of Magadha.

Persia

The Persians succeeded Elam in the mid 1st millennium. They may have been the first to yoke four horses to their chariots. They also used scythed chariots. Cyrus the Younger employed these chariots in large numbers at the Battle of Cunaxa.

Herodotus mentions that the Ancient Libyan and the Ancient Indian (Sattagydia, Gandhara and Hindush) satrapies supplied cavalry and chariots to Xerxes the Great's army. However, by this time, cavalry was far more effective and agile than the chariot, and the defeat of Darius III at the Battle of Gaugamela (331 BCE), where the army of Alexander simply opened their lines and let the chariots pass and attacked them from behind, marked the end of the era of chariot warfare (barring the Seleucid and Pontic powers, India, China, and the Celtic peoples).

Introduction in the Near East 
Chariots were introduced in the Near East in the 17(18)th–16th centuries BCE. Some scholars argue that the horse chariot was most likely a product of the ancient Near East early in the 2nd millennium BCE. Archaeologist Joost Crouwel writes that "Chariots were not sudden inventions, but developed out of earlier vehicles that were mounted on disk or cross-bar wheels. This development can best be traced in the Near East, where spoke-wheeled and horse-drawn chariots are first attested in the earlier part of the second millennium BC..." and were illustrated on a Syrian cylinder seal dated to either the 18th or 17th century BCE.

Maykop culture
Starokorsunskaya kurgan in the Kuban region of Russia contains a wagon grave (or chariot burial) of the Maikop Culture (which also had horses). The two solid wooden wheels from this kurgan have been dated to the second half of the fourth millennium. Soon thereafter the number of such burials in this Northern Caucasus region multiplied. Linguistic evidence also suggests that the inventors were Indo-European people from Eurasia.

Early wheeled vehicles in the Near East

According to Christoph Baumer, the earliest discoveries of wheels in Mesopotamia come from the first half of the third millennium BCE – more than half a millennium later than the first finds from the Kuban region. At the same time, in Mesopotamia, some intriguing early pictograms of a sled that rests on wooden rollers or wheels have been found. They date from about the same time as the early wheel discoveries in Europe and may indicate knowledge of the wheel.

The earliest depiction of vehicles in the context of warfare is on the Standard of Ur in southern Mesopotamia, . These are more properly called wagons which were double-axled and pulled by oxen or a hybrid of a donkey and a female onager, named Kunga in the city of Nagar which was famous for breeding them. The hybrids were used by the Eblaite, early Sumerian, Akkadian and Ur III armies. Although sometimes carrying a spearman with the charioteer (driver), such heavy wagons, borne on solid wooden wheels and covered with skins, may have been part of the baggage train (e.g., during royal funeral processions) rather than vehicles of battle in themselves.

The Sumerians had a lighter, two-wheeled type of cart, pulled by four asses, and with solid wheels. The spoked wheel did not appear in Mesopotamia until the mid second millennium BCE.

Ancient Canaan and Israel

Chariots are frequently mentioned in the Hebrew Tanakh and the Greek Old Testament, respectively, particularly by the prophets, as instruments of war or as symbols of power or glory. First mentioned in the story of Joseph (Genesis 50:9), "Iron chariots" are mentioned also in Joshua (17:16, 18) and Judges (1:19,4:3, 13) as weapons of the Canaanites and Israelites. 1 Samuel 13:5 mentions chariots of the Philistines, who are sometimes identified with the Sea Peoples or early Greeks.

Examples from The Jewish Study Bible of the Tanakh (Jewish Bible) include:

Isaiah 2:7 Their land is full of silver and gold, there is no limit to their treasures; their land is full of horses, there is no limit to their chariots.
Jeremiah 4:13 Lo, he [I.e., the invader of v. 7.] ascends like clouds, his chariots are like a whirlwind, his horses are swifter than eagles. Woe to us, we are ruined!
Ezekiel 26:10 From the cloud raised by his horses dust shall cover you; from the clatter of horsemen and wheels and chariots, your walls shall shake−when he enters your gates as men enter a breached city.
Psalms 20:8 They [call] on chariots, they [call] on horses, but we call on the name of the LORD our God.
Song of Songs 1:9 I have likened you, my darling, to a mare in Pharaoh's chariots 

Examples from the King James Version of the Christian Bible include:
 And Solomon gathered chariots and horsemen: and he had a thousand and four hundred chariots, and twelve thousand horsemen, which he placed in the chariot cities, and with the king at Jerusalem.
 And the LORD was with Judah; and he drave out the inhabitants of the mountain; but could not drive out the inhabitants of the valley, because they had chariots of iron.
Acts 8:37–38 Then Philip said, "If you believe with all your heart, you may." And he answered and said, "I believe that Jesus Christ is the Son of God." So he commanded the chariot to stand still. And both Philip and the eunuch went down into the water, and he baptized him.

Small domestic horses may have been present in the northern Negev before 3000 BC. Jezreel (city) has been identified as the chariot base of King Ahab. And a decorated bronze tablet thought to be the head of a lynchpin of a Canaanite chariot was found at a site that may be Sisera's fortress Harosheth Haggoyim.

Egypt

Chariot use made its way into Egypt around 1650 BCE during the Hyksos invasion of Egypt and establishment of the fourteenth dynasty. In 1659 BCE the Indo-European Hittites sacked Babylon, which demonstrated the superiority of chariots in antiquity.

The chariot and horse were used extensively in Egypt by the Hyksos invaders from the 16th century BC onwards, though discoveries announced in 2013 potentially place the earliest chariot use as early as Egypt's Old Kingdom (–2181 BCE). In the remains of Egyptian and Assyrian art, there are numerous representations of chariots, which display rich ornamentation. The chariots of the Egyptians and Assyrians, with whom the bow was the principal arm of attack, were richly mounted with quivers full of arrows. As a general rule, the Egyptians used chariots as mobile archery platforms; chariots always had two men, with the driver steering the chariot with his reins while the main archer aimed his bow and arrow at any targets within range. The best preserved examples of Egyptian chariots are the four specimens from the tomb of Tutankhamun. Chariots can be pulled by two or more horses.

Introduction in Bronze-Age Europe

As David W. Anthony writes in his book The Horse, the Wheel, and Language, in Eastern Europe, the earliest well-dated depiction of a wheeled vehicle (a wagon with two axles and four wheels) is on the Bronocice pot. It is a clay pot excavated in a Funnelbeaker settlement in Swietokrzyskie Voivodeship in Poland. The oldest securely dated real wheel-axle combination in Eastern Europe is the Ljubljana Marshes Wheel.

Greece 

The later Greeks of the first millennium BCE had a (still not very effective) cavalry arm (indeed, it has been argued that these early horseback riding soldiers may have given rise to the development of the later, heavily armed foot-soldiers known as hoplites), and the rocky terrain of the Greek mainland was unsuited for wheeled vehicles. Consequently, in historical Greece the chariot was never used to any extent in war. Nevertheless, the chariot retained a high status and memories of its era were handed down in epic poetry. Linear B tablets from Mycenaean palaces record large inventories of chariots, sometimes with specific details as to how many chariots were assembled or not (i.e. stored in modular form). Later the vehicles were used in games and processions, notably for races at the Olympic and Panathenaic Games and other public festivals in ancient Greece, in hippodromes and in contests called agons. They were also used in ceremonial functions, as when a paranymph, or friend of a bridegroom, went with him in a chariot to fetch the bride home.

Herodotus (Histories, 5. 9) Reports that chariots were widely used in the Pontic–Caspian steppe by the Sigynnae.

Greek chariots were made to be drawn by two horses attached to a central pole. If two additional horses were added, they were attached on each side of the main pair by a single bar or trace fastened to the front or prow of the chariot, as may be seen on two prize vases in the British Museum from the Panathenaic Games at Athens, Greece, in which the driver is seated with feet resting on a board hanging down in front close to the legs of the horses. The biga itself consists of a seat resting on the axle, with a rail at each side to protect the driver from the wheels. Greek chariots appear to have lacked any other attachment for the horses, which would have made turning difficult.

The body or basket of the chariot rested directly on the axle (called beam) connecting the two wheels. There was no suspension, making this an uncomfortable form of transport. At the front and sides of the basket was a semicircular guard about 3 ft (1 m) high, to give some protection from enemy attack. At the back the basket was open, making it easy to mount and dismount. There was no seat, and generally only enough room for the driver and one passenger.

The reins were mostly the same as those in use in the 19th century, and were made of leather and ornamented with studs of ivory or metal. The reins were passed through rings attached to the collar bands or yoke, and were long enough to be tied round the waist of the charioteer to allow for defense.

The wheels and basket of the chariot were usually of wood, strengthened in places with bronze or iron. The wheels had from four to eight spokes and tires of bronze or iron. Due to the widely spaced spokes, the rim of the chariot wheel was held in tension over comparatively large spans. Whilst this provided a small measure of shock absorption, it also necessitated the removal of the wheels when the chariot was not in use, to prevent warping from continued weight bearing. Most other nations of this time had chariots of similar design to the Greeks, the chief differences being the mountings.

According to Greek mythology, the chariot was invented by Erichthonius of Athens to conceal his feet, which were those of a dragon.

The most notable appearance of the chariot in Greek mythology occurs when Phaëton, the son of Helios, in an attempt to drive the chariot of the sun, managed to set the earth on fire. This story led to the archaic meaning of a phaeton as one who drives a chariot or coach, especially at a reckless or dangerous speed. Plato, in his Chariot Allegory, depicted a chariot drawn by two horses, one well behaved and the other troublesome, representing opposite impulses of human nature; the task of the charioteer, representing reason, was to stop the horses from going different ways and to guide them towards enlightenment.

The Greek word for chariot, ἅρμα, hárma, is also used nowadays to denote a tank, properly called άρμα μάχης, árma mákhēs, literally a "combat chariot".

Central and Northern Europe 

The Trundholm sun chariot is dated to c. 1400 BCE (see: Nordic Bronze Age). The horse drawing the solar disk runs on four wheels, and the Sun itself on two. All wheels have four spokes. The "chariot" comprises the solar disk, the axle, and the wheels, and it is unclear whether the sun is depicted as the chariot or as the passenger. Nevertheless, the presence of a model of a horse-drawn vehicle on two spoked wheels in Northern Europe at such an early time is astonishing.

In addition to the Trundholm chariot, there are numerous petroglyphs from the Nordic Bronze Age that depict chariots. One petroglyph, drawn on a stone slab in a double burial from c. 1000 BCE, depicts a biga with two four-spoked wheels.

The use of the composite bow in chariot warfare is not attested in northern Europe.

Western Europe and British Isles 
The Celts were famous for their chariots and modern English words like car, carriage and carry are ultimately derived from the native Brythonic language (Modern Welsh: Cerbyd). The word chariot itself is derived from the Norman French charriote and shares a Celtic root (Gaulish: karros). Some 20 iron-aged chariot burials have been excavated in Britain, roughly dating from between 500 BCE and 100 BCE. Virtually all of them were found in East Yorkshire – the exception was a find in 2001 in Newbridge, 10 km west of Edinburgh.

British chariots were open in front. Julius Caesar provides the only significant eyewitness report of British chariot warfare:

Chariots play an important role in Irish mythology surrounding the hero Cú Chulainn.

Chariots could also be used for ceremonial purposes. According to Tacitus (Annals 14.35), Boudica, queen of the Iceni and a number of other tribes in a formidable uprising against the occupying Roman forces, addressed her troops from a chariot in 61:

 "Boudicca curru filias prae se vehens, ut quamque nationem accesserat, solitum quidem Britannis feminarum ductu bellare testabatur"

 Boudicca, with her daughters before her in a chariot, went up to tribe after tribe, protesting that it was indeed usual for Britons to fight under the leadership of women.

The last mention of chariot use in battle seems to be at the Battle of Mons Graupius, somewhere in modern Scotland, in 84 CE. From Tacitus (Agricola 1.35–36) "The plain between resounded with the noise and with the rapid movements of chariots and cavalry." The chariots did not win even their initial engagement with the Roman auxiliaries: "Meantime the enemy's cavalry had fled, and the charioteers had mingled in the engagement of the infantry."

Later through the centuries, the chariot was replaced by the "war wagon". The "war wagon" was a medieval development used to attack rebel or enemy forces on battle fields. The wagon was given slits for archers to shoot enemy targets, supported by infantry using pikes and flails and later for the invention of gunfire by hand-gunners; side walls were used for protection against archers, crossbowmen, the early use of gunpowder and cannon fire.

It was especially useful during the Hussite Wars, c. 1420, by Hussite forces rebelling in Bohemia. Groups of them could form defensive works, but they also were used as hardpoints for Hussite formations or as firepower in pincer movements. This early use of gunpowder and innovative tactics helped a largely peasant infantry stave off attacks by the Holy Roman Empire's larger forces of mounted knights.

Etruria 

The only intact Etruscan chariot dates to c. 530 BCE and was uncovered as part of a chariot burial at Monteleone di Spoleto. Currently in the collection of the Metropolitan Museum of Art, it is decorated with bronze plates decorated with detailed low-relief scenes, commonly interpreted as depicting episodes from the life of Achilles.

Urartu 
In Urartu (860–590 BC), the chariot was used by both the nobility and the military. In Erebuni (Yerevan), King Argishti of Urartu is depicted riding on a chariot which is pulled by two horses. The chariot has two wheels and each wheel has about eight spokes. This type of chariot was used around 800 BCE.

Rome 

In the Roman Empire, chariots were not used for warfare, but for chariot racing, especially in circuses, or for triumphal processions, when they could be pulled by as many as ten horses or even by dogs, tigers, or ostriches. There were four divisions, or factiones, of charioteers, distinguished by the colour of their costumes: the red, blue, green and white teams. The main centre of chariot racing was the Circus Maximus, situated in the valley between the Palatine and Aventine Hills in Rome. The track could hold 12 chariots, and the two sides of the track were separated by a raised median termed the spina. Chariot races continued to enjoy great popularity in Byzantine times, in the Hippodrome of Constantinople, even after the Olympic Games had been disbanded, until their decline after the Nika riots in the 6th century. The starting gates were known as the Carceres.

An ancient Roman car or chariot pulled by four horses abreast together with the horses pulling it was called a Quadriga, from the Latin quadriugi (of a team of four). The term sometimes meant instead the four horses without the chariot or the chariot alone. A three-horse chariot, or the three-horse team pulling it, was a triga, from triugi (of a team of three). A two-horse chariot, or the two-horse team pulling it, was a biga, from biugi.

A popular legend that has been around since at least 1937 traces the origin of the 4 ft  in standard railroad gauge to Roman times, suggesting that it was based on the distance between the ruts of rutted roads marked by chariot wheels dating from the Roman Empire.  This is encouraged by the fact that the otherwise peculiar distance is almost exactly 5 Roman feet but there is no evidence to span the millennium and a half between the departure of the Romans from Britain and the adoption of the gauge on the Stockton and Darlington Railway in 1825.

Introduction in Ancient China 
 

The earliest archaeological evidence of chariots in China, a chariot burial site discovered in 1933 at Hougang, Anyang in Henan province, dates to the rule of King Wu Ding of the late Shang Dynasty. Oracle bone inscriptions suggest that the western enemies of the Shang used limited numbers of chariots in battle, but the Shang themselves used them only as mobile command-vehicles and in royal hunts.

During the Shang Dynasty, members of the royal family were buried with a complete household and servants, including a chariot, horses, and a charioteer. A Shang chariot was often drawn by two horses, but four-horse variants are occasionally found in burials.

Jacques Gernet claims that the Zhou dynasty, which conquered the Shang ca. 1046 BCE, made more use of the chariot than did the Shang and "invented a new kind of harness with four horses abreast". The crew consisted of an archer, a driver, and sometimes a third warrior who was armed with a spear or dagger-axe. From the 8th to 5th centuries BCE the Chinese use of chariots reached its peak. Although chariots appeared in greater numbers, infantry often defeated charioteers in battle.

Massed-chariot warfare became all but obsolete after the Warring-States Period (476–221 BCE). Chariots would continue to serve as command posts for officers during the Qin dynasty (221–206 BCE) and the Han Dynasty (206 BCE–220 CE), while armored chariots were also used during the Han Dynasty against the Xiongnu Confederation in the Han–Xiongnu War (133 BC to 89 CE), specifically at the Battle of Mobei (119 BCE).

Before the Han Dynasty, the power of Chinese states and dynasties was often measured by the number of chariots they were known to have. A country of a thousand chariots ranked as a medium country, and a country of ten thousand chariots ranked as a huge and powerful country.

See also

 Cavalry
 Chariot burial
 Chariot clock
 Chariot tactics
 Chuckwagon
 Chuckwagon racing
 Merkava
 Ratha
 South-pointing chariot
 Sulky
 Tachanka
 Tanks
 Technical (vehicle)
 Temple car
 Wagon
 Zamburak

Notes

References

Sources
Printed sources

 
 

 

 

 
 

 

 

 

 

 

 
 

Web-sources

Further reading
 Chamberlin, J. Edward. Horse: How the horse has shaped civilizations. N.Y.: United Tribes Media Inc., 2006.
 Cotterell, Arthur. Chariot: From chariot to tank, the astounding rise and fall of the world's first war machine. Woodstock & New York: The Overlook Press, 2005.
 Crouwel, Joost H. Chariots and other means of land transport in Bronze Age Greece (Allard Pierson Series, 3). Amsterdam: Allard Pierson Museum, 1981.
 Crouwel, Joost H. Chariots and other wheeled vehicles in Iron Age Greece  (Allard Pierson Series, 9). Amsterdam: Allard Pierson Museum:, 1993.
 Drews, Robert. The coming of the Greeks: Indo-European conquests in the Aegean and the Near East. Princeton: Princeton University Press, 1988 (hardcover); 1989 (paperback).
 Drews, Robert. The end of the Bronze Age: Changes in warfare and the catastrophe ca. 1200 B.C. Princeton: Princeton University Press, 1993 (hardcover); 1995 (paperback).
 Drews, Robert. Early riders: The beginnings of mounted warfare in Asia and Europe. N.Y.: Routledge, 2004.
 Fields, Nic; Brian Delf (illustrator). Bronze Age War Chariots (New Vanguard). Oxford; New York: Osprey Publishing, 2006.
 Greenhalg, P A L. Early Greek warfare; horsemen and chariots in the Homeric and Archaic Ages. Cambridge University Press, 1973..
 Kulkarni, Raghunatha Purushottama. Visvakarmiya Rathalaksanam: Study of Ancient Indian Chariots: with a historical note, references, Sanskrit text, and translation in English. Delhi: Kanishka Publishing House, 1994
 
 Littauer, Mary A.; Crouwel, Joost H. Chariots and related equipment from the tomb of Tutankhamun (Tutankhamun's Tomb Series, 8). Oxford: The Griffith Institute, 1985.
 Littauer, Mary A.; Crouwel, Joost H.; Raulwing, Peter (Editor). Selected writings on chariots and other early vehicles, riding and harness (Culture and history of the ancient Near East, 6). Leiden: Brill Academic Publishers, 2002.
 Moorey, P.R.S. "The Emergence of the Light, Horse-Drawn Chariot in the Near-East c. 2000–1500 B.C.", World Archaeology, Vol. 18, No. 2. (1986), pp. 196–215.
 Piggot, Stuart. The earliest wheeled transport from the Atlantic Coast to the Caspian Sea. Ithaca, New York: Cornell University Press, 1983.
 Piggot, Stuart. Wagon, chariot and carriage: Symbol and status in the history of transport. London: Thames & Hudson, 1992.
 Pogrebova M. The emergence of chariots and riding in the South Caucasus in Oxford Journal of Archaeology, Volume 22, Number 4, November 2003, pp. 397–409.
 Sandor, Bela I. The rise and decline of the Tutankhamun-class chariot in Oxford Journal of Archaeology, Volume 23, Number 2, May 2004, pp. 153–175.
 Sandor, Bela I. Tutankhamun's chariots: Secret treasures of engineering mechanics in Fatigue & Fracture of Engineering Materials & Structures, Volume 27, Number 7, July 2004, pp. 637–646.

External links

 Sumerian war chariots reconstructed. Photographic restoration of three of the chariots on the Standard of Ur.
 Sumerian war chariots deconstructed. What did a Sumerian war chariot really look like?
"The Horse, the Wheel and Language, How Bronze-Age Riders from the Eurasian Steppes shaped the Modern World", David W Anthony, 2007
 Ancient Egyptian chariots: history, design, use. Ancient Egypt: an introduction to its history and culture.
 Chariot Usage in Greek Dark Age Warfare, by Carolyn Nicole Conter: Title page for Electronic Theses and Dissertations ETD etd-11152003-164515. Florida State University ETD Collection.
 Chariots in Greece. Hellenica – Michael Lahanas.
 Kamat Research Database – Prehistoric Carts. Varieties of Carts and Chariots in prehistoric cave shelter paintings found in Central India. Kamat's Potpourri – The History, Mystery, and Diversity of India.
 Ludi circenses (longer version). SocietasViaRomana.net.

Animal-powered vehicles
Archaeological artefact types
Bronze Age
 
Indo-European warfare
Indo-European archaeological artifacts
Iron Age